Pascale Alajouanine (born 23 April 1955) is a French aviator and aerobatics champion.

Life 
Alajouanine was born in Hazebrouck, Nord, France. She works part-time as an optician. She is a member of the French national aerobatics team and a CAP10 champion in France. She also flies CAP 232 aircraft.

References

Living people
1955 births
People from Hazebrouck
French aviators
Aerobatic pilots
French women aviators
Sportspeople from Nord (French department)